Newline (frequently called line ending, end of line (EOL), next line (NEL) or line break) is a control character or sequence of control characters in character encoding specifications such as ASCII, EBCDIC, Unicode, etc. This character, or a sequence of characters, is used to signify the end of a line of text and the start of a new one.

History 
In the mid-1800s, long before the advent of teleprinters and teletype machines, Morse code operators or telegraphists invented and used Morse code prosigns to encode white space text formatting in formal written text messages. In particular the Morse prosign  (mnemonic reak ext) represented by the concatenation of literal textual Morse codes "B" and "T" characters sent without the normal inter-character spacing is used in Morse code to encode and indicate a new line or new section in a formal text message.

Later, in the age of modern teleprinters, standardized character set control codes were developed to aid in white space text formatting. ASCII was developed simultaneously by the International Organization for Standardization (ISO) and the American Standards Association (ASA), the latter being the predecessor organization to American National Standards Institute (ANSI). During the period of 1963 to 1968, the ISO draft standards supported the use of either + or  alone as a newline, while the ASA drafts supported only +.

The sequence + was commonly used on many early computer systems that had adopted Teletype machines—typically a Teletype Model 33 ASR—as a console device, because this sequence was required to position those printers at the start of a new line. The separation of newline into two functions concealed the fact that the print head could not return from the far right to the beginning of the next line in time to print the next character. Any character printed after a  would often print as a smudge in the middle of the page while the print head was still moving the carriage back to the first position. In fact, it was often necessary to send extra characters—extraneous CRs or NULs—which are ignored but give the print head time to move to the left margin. Many early video displays also required multiple character times to scroll the display.

On such systems, applications had to talk directly to the Teletype machine and follow its conventions since the concept of device drivers hiding such hardware details from the application was not yet well developed. Therefore, text was routinely composed to satisfy the needs of Teletype machines. Most minicomputer systems from DEC used this convention. CP/M also used it in order to print on the same terminals that minicomputers used. From there MS-DOS (1981) adopted CP/M's + in order to be compatible, and this convention was inherited by Microsoft's later Windows operating system.

The Multics operating system began development in 1964 and used  alone as its newline. Multics used a device driver to translate this character to whatever sequence a printer needed (including extra padding characters), and the single byte was more convenient for programming. What seems like a more obvious  choice——was not used, as  provided the useful function of overprinting one line with another to create boldface, underscore and strikethrough effects. Perhaps more importantly, the use of  alone as a line terminator had already been incorporated into drafts of the eventual ISO/IEC 646 standard. Unix followed the Multics practice, and later Unix-like systems followed Unix. This created conflicts between Windows and Unix-like operating systems, whereby files composed on one operating system could not be properly formatted or interpreted by another operating system (for example a UNIX shell script written in a Windows text editor like Notepad).

Representation 
The concepts of carriage return (CR) and line feed (LF) are closely associated and can be considered either separately or together. In the physical media of typewriters and printers, two axes of motion, "down" and "across", are needed to create a new line on the page. Although the design of a machine (typewriter or printer) must consider them separately, the abstract logic of software can combine them together as one event.

Some character sets provide a separate newline character code. Unicode, in addition to providing the ASCII  and  control codes, also provides a "next line" control code, as well as control codes for "line separator" and "paragraph separator" markers.

EBCDIC systems—mainly IBM mainframe systems, including z/OS (OS/390) and IBM i (OS/400)—use  (New Line) as the character combining the functions of line feed and carriage return. The equivalent Unicode character is called  (Next Line). Additionally, some EBCDIC variants also use  but assign a different numeric code to the character. However, those operating systems use a record-based file system, which stores text files as one record per line. In most file formats, no line terminators are actually stored.
Operating systems for the CDC 6000 series defined a newline as two or more zero-valued six-bit characters at the end of a 60-bit word. Some configurations also defined a zero-valued character as a colon character, with the result that multiple colons could be interpreted as a newline depending on position.
RSX-11 and OpenVMS also use a record-based file system, which stores text files as one record per line. In most file formats, no line terminators are actually stored, but the Record Management Services facility can transparently add a terminator to each line when it is retrieved by an application. The records themselves can contain the same line terminator characters, which can either be considered a feature or a nuisance depending on the application. RMS not only stores records, but also stores metadata about the record separators in different bits for the file to complicate matters even more (since files can have fixed length records, records that are prefixed by a count or records that are terminated by a specific character).
Fixed line length was used by some early mainframe operating systems. In such a system, an implicit end-of-line was assumed every 72 or 80 characters, for example. No newline character was stored. If a file was imported from the outside world, lines shorter than the line length had to be padded with spaces, while lines longer than the line length had to be truncated. This mimicked the use of punched cards, on which each line was stored on a separate card, usually with 80 columns on each card, often with sequence numbers in columns 73–80. Many of these systems added a carriage control character to the start of the next record; this could indicate whether the next record was a continuation of the line started by the previous record, or a new line, or should overprint the previous line (similar to a ). Often this was a normal printing character such as  that thus could not be used as the first character in a line. Some early line printers interpreted these characters directly in the records sent to them.

Unicode 

The Unicode standard defines a number of characters that conforming applications should recognize as line terminators:

: Line Feed, 
: Vertical Tab, 
: Form Feed, 
: Carriage Return, 
+:  followed by 
: Next Line, 
: Line Separator, 
: Paragraph Separator, 

This may seem overly complicated compared to an approach such as converting all line terminators to a single character, for example . However, Unicode was designed to preserve all information when converting a text file from any existing encoding to Unicode and back. Therefore, Unicode should contain characters included in existing encodings.

As such, it is defined by ECMA 48, and recognized by encodings compliant with ISO/IEC 2022 (which is equivalent to ECMA 35). C1 control set is also compatible with ISO-8859-1. The approach taken in the Unicode standard allows round-trip transformation to be information-preserving while still enabling applications to recognize all possible types of line terminators.

They are multiple bytes in UTF-8, and the code for  has been used as the ellipsis character in Windows-1252. For instance:
JSON allows  and  characters within strings, while ECMAScript prior to  treated them as newlines, and therefore illegal syntax.
YAML no longer recognizes them as special as of version 1.2, in order to be compatible with JSON.

In programming languages 

To facilitate the creation of portable programs, programming languages provide some abstractions to deal with the different types of newline sequences used in different environments.

However, these are not required to be equivalent to the ASCII  and  control characters. The C standard only guarantees two things:
 Each of these escape sequences maps to a unique implementation-defined number that can be stored in a single  value.
 When writing to a file, device node, or socket/fifo in text mode,  is transparently translated to the native newline sequence used by the system, which may be longer than one character.

On Unix platforms, where C originated, the native newline sequence is ASCII , so  was simply defined to be that value. With the internal and external representation being identical, the translation performed in text mode is a no-op, and Unix has no notion of text mode or binary mode. This has caused many programmers who developed their software on Unix systems simply to ignore the distinction completely, resulting in code that is not portable to different platforms.

The C library function  is best avoided in binary mode because any file not written with the Unix newline convention will be misread. Also, in text mode, any file not written with the system's native newline sequence (such as a file created on a Unix system, then copied to a Windows system) will be misread as well.

Another common problem is the use of  when communicating using an Internet protocol that mandates the use of ASCII + for ending lines. Writing  to a text mode stream works correctly on Windows systems, but produces only  on Unix, and something completely different on more exotic systems. Using  in binary mode is slightly better.

Java, PHP, and Python provide the  sequence (for ASCII +).

The Java I/O libraries do not transparently translate these into platform-dependent newline sequences on input or output. The  method can be used to retrieve the underlying line separator.

Example:
   String eol = System.lineSeparator();
   String lineColor = "Color: Red" + eol;

Python permits "Universal Newline Support" when opening a file for reading, when importing modules, and when executing a file.

Some languages have created special variables, constants, and subroutines to facilitate newlines during program execution. In PHP, to avoid portability problems, newline sequences should be issued using the PHP_EOL constant.

Example in C#:
   string eol = Environment.NewLine;
   string lineColor = "Color: Red" + eol;
   
   string eol2 = "\n";
   string lineColor2 = "Color: Blue" + eol2;

Issues with different newline formats 

The different newline conventions cause text files that have been transferred between systems of different types to be displayed incorrectly.

Text in files created with programs which are common on Unix-like or classic Mac OS, appear as a single long line on most programs common to MS-DOS and Microsoft Windows because these do not display a single  or a single  as a line break.

Furthermore, programs other than text editors may not accept a file, e.g. some configuration file, encoded using the foreign newline convention, as a valid file.

The problem can be hard to spot because some programs handle the foreign newlines properly while others do not. For example, a compiler may fail with obscure syntax errors even though the source file looks correct when displayed on the console or in an editor. Modern text editors generally recognize all flavours of + newlines and allow users to convert between the different standards. Web browsers are usually also capable of displaying text files and websites which use different types of newlines.

Even if a program supports different newline conventions, these features are often not sufficiently labeled, described, or documented. Typically a menu or combo-box enumerating different newline conventions will be displayed to users without an indication if the selection will re-interpret, temporarily convert, or permanently convert the newlines. Some programs will implicitly convert on open, copy, paste, or save—often inconsistently.

Most textual Internet protocols (including HTTP, SMTP, FTP, IRC, and many others) mandate the use of ASCII + on the protocol level, but recommend that tolerant applications recognize lone  as well. Despite the dictated standard, many applications erroneously use the C newline escape sequence  instead of the correct combination of carriage return escape and newline escape sequences  (+) (see section Newline in programming languages above). This accidental use of the wrong escape sequences leads to problems when trying to communicate with systems adhering to the stricter interpretation of the standards instead of the suggested tolerant interpretation. One such intolerant system is the qmail mail transfer agent that actively refuses to accept messages from systems that send bare  instead of the required +.

The standard Internet Message Format for email states: "CR and LF MUST only occur together as CRLF; they MUST NOT appear independently in the body".

The File Transfer Protocol can automatically convert newlines in files being transferred between systems with different newline representations when the transfer is done in "ASCII mode". However, transferring binary files in this mode usually has disastrous results: any occurrence of the newline byte sequence—which does not have line terminator semantics in this context, but is just part of a normal sequence of bytes—will be translated to whatever newline representation the other system uses, effectively corrupting the file. FTP clients often employ some heuristics (for example, inspection of filename extensions) to automatically select either binary or ASCII mode, but in the end it is up to users to make sure their files are transferred in the correct mode. If there is any doubt as to the correct mode, binary mode should be used, as then no files will be altered by FTP, though they may display incorrectly.

Conversion between newline formats 
Text editors are often used for converting a text file between different newline formats; most modern editors can read and write files using at least the different ASCII / conventions.

For example, the editor Vim can make a file compatible with the Windows Notepad text editor. Within vim
 :set fileformat=dos
 :wq
Editors can be unsuitable for converting larger files or bulk conversion of many files. For larger files (on Windows NT/2000/XP) the following command is often used:
D:\>TYPE unix_file | FIND /V "" > dos_file
The  command is available on virtually every Unix-like system and can be used to perform arbitrary replacement operations on single characters. A DOS/Windows text file can be converted to Unix format by simply removing all ASCII  characters with
 $ tr -d '\r' < inputfile > outputfile
 $ tr '\r' '\n' < inputfile > outputfile

The same tasks are sometimes performed with awk, sed, or in Perl if the platform has a Perl interpreter:
$ awk '{sub("$","\r\n"); printf("%s",$0);}' inputfile > outputfile  # UNIX to DOS  (adding CRs on Linux and BSD based OS that haven't GNU extensions)
$ awk '{gsub("\r",""); print;}' inputfile > outputfile              # DOS to UNIX  (removing CRs on Linux and BSD based OS that haven't GNU extensions)
$ sed -e 's/$/\r/' inputfile > outputfile              # UNIX to DOS  (adding CRs on Linux based OS that use GNU extensions)
$ sed -e 's/\r$//' inputfile > outputfile              # DOS  to UNIX (removing CRs on Linux based OS that use GNU extensions)
$ perl -pe 's/\r?\n|\r/\r\n/g' inputfile > outputfile  # Convert to DOS
$ perl -pe 's/\r?\n|\r/\n/g'   inputfile > outputfile  # Convert to UNIX
$ perl -pe 's/\r?\n|\r/\r/g'   inputfile > outputfile  # Convert to old Mac
The  command can identify the type of line endings:
 $ file myfile.txt
 myfile.txt: ASCII English text, with CRLF line terminators
The Unix egrep (extended grep) command can be used to print filenames of Unix or DOS files (assuming Unix and DOS-style files only, no classic Mac OS-style files):
$ egrep -L '\r\n' myfile.txt # show UNIX style file (LF terminated)
$ egrep -l '\r\n' myfile.txt # show DOS style file (CRLF terminated)

Other tools permit the user to visualise the EOL characters:
$ od -a myfile.txt
$ cat -e myfile.txt
$ cat -v myfile.txt
$ hexdump -c myfile.txt

Interpretation 
Two ways to view newlines, both of which are self-consistent, are that newlines either separate lines or that they terminate lines. If a newline is considered a separator, there will be no newline after the last line of a file. Some programs have problems processing the last line of a file if it is not terminated by a newline. On the other hand, programs that expect newline to be used as a separator will interpret a final newline as starting a new (empty) line. Conversely, if a newline is considered a terminator, all text lines including the last are expected to be terminated by a newline. If the final character sequence in a text file is not a newline, the final line of the file may be considered to be an improper or incomplete text line, or the file may be considered to be improperly truncated.

In text intended primarily to be read by humans using software which implements the word wrap feature, a newline character typically only needs to be stored if a line break is required independent of whether the next word would fit on the same line, such as between paragraphs and in vertical lists. Therefore, in the logic of word processing and most text editors, newline is used as a paragraph break and is known as a "hard return", in contrast to "soft returns" which are dynamically created to implement word wrapping and are changeable with each display instance. In many applications a separate control character called "manual line break" exists for forcing line breaks inside a single paragraph. The glyph for the control character for a hard return is usually a pilcrow (¶), and for the manual line break is usually a carriage return arrow (↵).

Reverse and partial line feeds 

, (U+008D REVERSE LINE FEED, ISO/IEC 6429 8D, decimal 141) is used to move the printing position back one line (by reverse feeding the paper, or by moving a display cursor up one line) so that other characters may be printed over existing text. This may be done to make them bolder, or to add underlines, strike-throughs or other characters such as diacritics.

These can be used in combination for subscripts (by advancing and then reversing) and superscripts (by reversing and then advancing), and may also be useful for printing diacritics.

See also 
ASA carriage control characters
C0 and C1 control codes
End-of-file
Line starve
Page break
Carriage return
Enter key

References

External links 
The Unicode reference, see paragraph 5.8 in Chapter 5 of the Unicode 4.0 standard (PDF)

The End of Line Puzzle
Line counter based on Newline Character

"The End-of-Line Story"

Control characters
Whitespace